The 2016 FireKeepers Casino 400 was a NASCAR Sprint Cup Series stock car race held on June 12, 2016 at Michigan International Speedway in Brooklyn, Michigan. Contested over 200 laps on the  D-shaped oval, it was the fifteenth race of the 2016 NASCAR Sprint Cup Series.

The race had 14 lead changes among different drivers and nine cautions for 46 laps.

Background 

The race was held at Michigan International Speedway, a  moderate-banked D-shaped speedway located in Brooklyn, Michigan. The track is used primarily for NASCAR events. It is sometimes known as a "sister track" to Texas World Speedway, and was used as the basis of Auto Club Speedway. The track is owned by International Speedway Corporation. Michigan International Speedway is recognized as one of motorsports' premier facilities because of its wide racing surface and high banking (by open-wheel standards; the 18-degree banking is modest by stock car standards).

Aero package 
Two weeks prior to the race, NASCAR announced they will test changes to the aero package.

NASCAR Executive Vice-President and Chief Racing Development Officer Steve O'Donnell said that NASCAR looks "at it as a never-ending journey; if we can improve we’re going to do that. We wanted to go the direction of low downforce, see how that worked, not kind of go all the way in and hope that we are directionally right. And we are seeing that play out. We’ve seen some great racing at the beginning of the year. But we also knew that we had some more levers that we could pull if the direction kind of proved out, so we’ve tried some of those things. We’ve tested it and what we’ve also wanted to do is lower some of the corner speeds to allow for even more passing. That was one of the areas where we’ve seen minimal change, but there are some levers we can pull to really drive that down.”

Entry list 
The preliminary entry list for the race included forty cars and was released on June 3, 2016 at 12:29 pm ET.

First practice 

Qualifying 
He said afterwards that starting first "feels good. Finally, we were able to break through. The last two weeks have stunk for me and my team. We have won the first two rounds the last few weeks and qualified second. Now we figured out how to be second in the first round and first in the last two. That is a good move. I couldn’t be more proud of the team and the effort they put into this new package. This is such an unknown showing up here so it is cool to show what all the engineers and simulation department were able to do to put together a good package off the truck. I am very happy to be driving this car.”

“A lot of fun out there,” Martin Truex Jr. said after qualifying second. “Slipping and sliding as the track got hot a slick. I like where we are with this package and tomorrow we’ll fine tune what we have, take the tape off and get dialed in for the race.”

After qualifying third, Tony Stewart said his team is "gaining on it. We've just got to get a little break here to get going. We were going good last week. The guy that won the race, our teammate [Kurt Busch], we were running the same lap times as him the whole race until we had our problem."

The session was halted in the first round after David Ragan spun out and tagged the wall with his right-rear corner.

Qualifying results

Practice (post-qualifying)

Second practice 

Final practice 

Race

First half

Start 

Under mostly sunny Michigan skies, Joey Logano led the field to the green at 1:19 p.m. He got loose in turn 1 and Martin Truex Jr. took the lead. In the first 10 laps, a number of drivers were reporting being "incredibly loose" because of the changes made to the aero package. Logano made his back to the lead on lap 11. By lap 25, Truex began reeling him in for the race lead. Green flag stops began around lap 39. Logano pitted from the lead two laps later and handed it to teammate Brad Keselowski. Landon Cassill was tagged for his crew being over the wall too soon and was forced to serve a pass-through penalty. Keselowski ran out of gas on the frontstretch on lap 46. He was saved by Truex spinning out in turn 3 which brought out the first caution of the race. He made it to pit road and the lead cycled back to Logano.

Second quarter 
The race restarted on lap 51. Kyle Busch's car caught fire in the engine area and blew up on the backstretch. This brought out the second caution of the race on lap 54. He said afterwards that he felt "the motor kind of going south for about 30 laps or so and finally let go. At least there was plenty of warning and I knew it was going to get hot in there and it certainly did once it let go and it was on fire. It’s just been a dismal month, just haven’t been able to hit anything and get good finishes going." He would go on to finish 40th.

The race restarted on lap 61. The third caution of the race flew on lap 62 for a two-car wreck on the backstretch. Exiting turn 2, Chris Buescher got loose and tapped the left-rear corner of Dale Earnhardt Jr. He got loose, came across the nose of A. J. Allmendinger and sent them both into the wall. Earnhardt continued down the backstretch and spun down the track. Earnhardt said afterwards that he "knew I was going to hit the wall. The No. 34 (Buescher) just drove into the left front quarter panel. Oh, man. I don’t know; them restarts and all that. You’ve got a responsibility to try and take care of everybody out there even when you’re three-wide. I’m disappointed in that. But, we had a pretty good car and we were just kind of taking our time, there. And the car was great. So, it’s a shame.” When asked about the wreck from his point of view, Allmendinger said he wasn't “really sure. I think Junior got hit and I was on the outside of him and that was it. It was kind of weird back there. I’m not really sure what kind of car we had. I thought in clean air we weren’t too bad, but I guess a lot of people could say that. Just not a lot of fun racing there.”

The race restarted on lap 69. A number of cars began pitting on lap 93. Logano pitted the next lap and handed the lead to Kyle Larson. He pitted the next lap and handed the lead to Keselowski. He pitted on lap 99 and handed the lead to Jimmie Johnson. The fourth caution of the race flew on lap 102 for Jeffrey Earnhardt slamming the wall in turn 2. Johnson pitted under the caution and the lead cycled back to Logano. Aric Almirola was tagged for having too many crew members over the wall and restarted the race from the tail-end of the field.

Second half

Halfway 
The race restarted on lap 107. The fifth caution of the race flew on lap 109 after Jeffrey Earnhardt's car caught on fire after slamming the wall a second time on the backstretch.

The race restarted with 84 laps to go. Logano didn't get a good restart and lost the lead to Chase Elliott. The sixth caution of the race flew with 53 laps to go after Regan Smith made contact with the wall and debris was scattered on the backstretch. Elliott and Logano swapped the lead on pit road, but Elliott exited with the lead.

Fourth quarter 
The race restarted with 47 laps to go. Elliott got a lousy restart and lost the lead to Logano. The seventh caution of the race flew with 46 to go after a multi-car wreck on the backstretch. Exiting turn 2, Casey Mears got into the wall, clipped Danica Patrick who then clipped Brian Scott and sent him head-on into the outside wall.

The race restarted with 40 laps to go. The eighth caution of the race flew with 38 laps to go for a single-car wreck in turn 2. Rounding the turn, Ryan Blaney got loose and slammed the wall. Not far behind, Trevor Bayne got into Johnson and he was slight contact with the wall. During the caution, Johnson drove up to the side of Bayne to show his displeasure. Bayne said over the radio that he "just got really loose there. It wasn’t intentional with the 48."

The race restarted with 33 laps to go. In the last 20 laps, Elliott began closing the deficit down to under a second. The ninth caution of the race flew with 12 laps to go for a single-car wreck on the frontstretch. Crossing the start/finish line, Denny Hamlin suffered a left-rear tire blowout, spun through the grass and hit the inside wall.

The race restarted with seven laps to go and Logano drove on to win the race.

Post-race

Driver comments
Logano said after the race that it was "a crazy race with the low downforce and with more cautions and more opportunity to screw up pretty much. What a fun race, racing with Chase and Kyle Larson. It is fun to see the young guys up there racing. I am not alone up there as a young guy anymore. I have guys up there younger than me racing for a win.”

Despite earning a career-best finish of second, Elliott said it was "not a good day, nope, not a good day" and that he "can’t do dumb stuff and expect to win this thing. When you do dumb stuff, you don’t win. I did dumb stuff today.”

“It was a solid run for us,” Larson said. “We’ve been consistent as we’ve been in the last year and a half anyways, so it’s nice to be running up front and getting closer to a win. Still got some work to do, but it is nice when we can get a package like this thrown at us just a few weeks before the race, and our guys at the shop and here at the racetrack can look at engineering data and come up with a good piece.”

=Earnhardt Jr's career-ending concussion

On August 1, 2016, Earnhardt admitted on his podcast that he had suffered what would become a season-ending injury at Michigan, but did not know of the seriousness until after the July Daytona race.  The U.S. Open break meant drivers had 12 days off before they returned to Sonoma, where he made a trip to Germany before returning to Sonoma.  After the ensuing race at Daytona, Earnhardt would be ruled out with concussion symptoms before the Kentucky round, after which he would not be cleared for the rest of the 2016 season, missing half the season.  It was found the concussion was a result of a crash in this race.

Media comments

Members of the NASCAR media gave their thoughts on the race itself.

Pete Pistone of the Motor Racing Network and Sirius XM NASCAR Radio said that "it was worthy of a B minus," the cars being loose "created a wild and wooly style of racing at least throughout the field," but that clean air "still was in play and the other drivers that led the 61 laps Logano didn’t clearly had the advantage once they were in the top spot" and that the package is "an ongoing process and NASCAR officials will sift through the data and information of Sunday’s race and no doubt use those takeaways to develop the 2017 rules package."

Shawn Windsor of the Detroit Free Press said that lowering "the downforce on the front of the cars let drivers rip along the long, wide straightways at MIS pushing 220 m.p.h. The increased speed — and alternately slower corner speed — meant drivers had more opportunity to maneuver and actually drive their cars." He also noted that "the speed difference between the turns and the straightaway was as much as 40 m.p.h. This means — in theory — drivers have a chance to really maneuver as they hit the stretch. And that means they need more control of their cars, which NASCAR aimed to give them with the new rules that let teams lower the downforce. The flip side, as Logano pointed out, is that extra speed and more bunched-together drivers — feeling like they have more control — 'is a recipe for disaster.' That recipe might be good for ratings, however. Everyone agrees the sport needs more passing, more jockeying. It’s in the heat of the scrum that reveals personalities, shows us who is willing to live on the edge and who is not."

Matt Weaver of Autoweek said that "one race with the extra-reduced downforce configurations [is] too small of a sample size to reach any sort of definite conclusion," especially "when considering that it was conducted on two-mile Michigan -- an anomaly on the Sprint Cup schedule," that "no package will ever be perfect," unless NASCAR implements "the most wacky of short track promotional tactics, the fastest cars and best drivers will always find their way to the front of the field," that Logano's dominant performance "shouldn't take away from what was a really enjoyable race -- and by most accounts -- a step in the right direction for the entire industry," that this race "was a massive improvement over the high drag package used last summer at Michigan and Indianapolis" and that "NASCAR is starting to move in the right direction and appears primed to make these cars even more unstable."

Race results

Race summary
 Lead changes: 14 among different drivers
 Cautions/Laps: 9 for 46
 Red flags: 0
 Time of race: 2 hours, 58 minutes and 47 seconds
 Average speed:

Media

Television 
Fox NASCAR televised the race in the United States on FS1 for the second consecutive year. Mike Joy was the lap-by-lap announcer, while three-time Michigan winner, Jeff Gordon and two-time winner Darrell Waltrip were the color commentators. Jamie Little, Vince Welch and Matt Yocum reported from pit lane during the race.

Radio 
Radio coverage of the race was broadcast by Motor Racing Network (MRN) and simulcasted on Sirius XM NASCAR Radio. Joe Moore, Jeff Striegle and five-time Michigan winner Rusty Wallace announced the race in the booth while the field is racing on the front stretch. Dave Moody called the race from a billboard outside of turn 2 when the field was racing through turns 1 and 2. Mike Bagley called the race from a platform outside of turn 3 when the field was racing through turns 3 and 4. Alex Hayden, Winston Kelley and Pete Pistone reported from pit lane during the race.

Standings after the race 

Note: Only the first 16 positions are included for the driver standings.. – Driver has clinched a position in the Chase for the Sprint Cup.

References 

FireKeepers Casino 400
FireKeepers Casino 400
NASCAR races at Michigan International Speedway
FireKeepers Casino 400